Todd Schlekeway (born April 12, 1977) is a former state senator who represented District 11 in the South Dakota legislature from 2009 to 2013, from Minnehaha County, South Dakota Schlekeway is a member of the Republican Party. Prior to becoming a state senator Schlekeway served as a representative in district 11.

References

1977 births
Living people
Politicians from Sioux Falls, South Dakota
Republican Party members of the South Dakota House of Representatives
Republican Party South Dakota state senators
21st-century American politicians